Joel Steven Fetzer (born November 13, 1965) is an American political scientist best known for his pioneering work on comparative politics, nationalism, and democratization. He is a distinguished professor of political science at Pepperdine University.

Life and work

Early life
Fetzer was born on November 13, 1965, in Jacksonville, Florida, to Menonite Christian parents. His father, a U.S. Naval intelligence officer, received orders to report to the Pentagon in Washington, D.C. and relocated the family to northern Virginia.

He attended Cornell University as an undergraduate where he wrote Selective Prosecution of Religiously Motivated Offenders in America: Scrutinizing the Myth of Neutrality. Fetzer matriculated at Yale University and completed his Doctor of Philosophy degree in 1996. He was awarded the Ebert Dissertation Fellowship from the Friedrich Ebert Foundation and the Peace Scholar Fellowship from the United States Institute of Peace.

His dissertation was published as Public Attitudes toward Immigration in the United States, France, and Germany in 2000. Fetzer taught at Central Michigan University from 1998 to 2000 then at Pepperdine University starting in 2001. He was coordinator of the political science department at Pepperdine from 2019 to 2022 and spent time as a visiting professor at the Centre for Interdisciplinary Research on Citizenship and Minorities (CIRCM) at University of Ottawa, the University of British Columbia, and the University of Luxembourg.

Research
Fetzer's book Religion and Nationalism in Global Perspective (2018), co-authored with Christopher Soper, explores the "resurgence of nationalism, usually populist, often religious, and all too often authoritarian" in the United States, Israel, India, Greece, Uruguay, and Malaysia and popularized the idea that the relationship between religion and nationalism for each and every nation in the world fits into one of three models: secular nationalism, religious nationalism, or civil-religious nationalism.

Fetzer and Soper, in the words of then President of the American Political Science Association (APSA) Rogers Smith, "produced a seminal theory of how and why religion and nationalism are related in distinct ways in different societies." Religion and Nationalism in Global Perspective was the first large-scale cross-national analysis undertaken to understand the emergence, development, and stability of different church-state arrangements over time. The research received the Society for the Scientific Study of Religion's Distinguished Book Award, which is given to the year's best book on the sociology of religion, in 2020.

Archives
The Fetzer's archives are maintained by Pepperdine University and the Online Archive of California (OAC).

Publications

Books

References

External links
Google Scholar
Faculty page

1965 births
Living people
Pepperdine University faculty
Yale University alumni
American political scientists
Cornell University alumni